Disambiguation pages
Henry Schoolcraft neologisms

Leelanau may refer to a number of articles relating to the region of the northwestern Lower Peninsula of Michigan:

Geography

Settlements 

 Leelanau County, Michigan
 Leelanau Township, Michigan
 Lake Leelanau, Michigan

Landforms 

 Lake Leelanau
 Leelanau Peninsula
 Leelanau Peninsula AVA
 Leelanau River (archaic name of the Leland River)

Sites 

 Lake Leelanau Narrows Bridge
 Leelanau Historical Society and Museum
 Leelanau State Park
 Leelanau Transit Company Suttons Bay Depot
 National Register of Historic Places listings in Leelanau County, Michigan

Education 

 The Leelanau School

Transportation 

 Leelanau Scenic Heritage Route
 Leelanau Trail
 Leelanau Transit Company
 Tour de Leelanau

See also 

 Leland (disambiguation)
 Leeland (disambiguation)